Ülker is a Turkish multinational food and beverage manufacturer based in Istanbul, Turkey. Its products are exported internationally, to 110 countries. Ülker's core products are biscuits, cookies, crackers, and chocolates, although it has expanded to other categories.

Ülker received the "Candy Company of the Year in Europe" award from the European Candy Kettle Club in 2004. In December 2007, the company acquired Godiva Chocolatier from the Campbell Soup Company for $850 million.

In 2016, Yıldız Holding transferred 51% of Ülker's shares to its new global business Pladis.

History

Ülker was founded in 1944 by Sabri and Asim Ülker, two brothers whose parents immigrated to Turkey from Crimea, commencing operations in Istanbul as a small bakery. A factory was opened in 1948. Ülker expanded in the 1970s to exporting to the Middle East market, chocolate manufacturing, and packaging. By the end of the 20th century, Ülker was manufacturing margarine, vegetable oil, and dairy products. In 2002, Ülker diversified into carbonated beverages and in 2003 added Turkish coffee, ice cream, and baby food to its product range. One of its more important products is Cola Turka, introduced into the Turkish market in 2003. The advertisement of Cola Turka featured actor Chevy Chase, and according to local sources Coca-Cola cut 10% off its prices due to the success of the Cola Turka launch.

Parent company Yıldız Holding employed more than 41,000 people and was the fifth on the list of the most successful manufacturers in Turkey in 2001. Ülker sales reach $1.5 billion internationally. Fulya Banu Sürücü has been appointed as the CFO of the company, effective from January 3, 2022.

See also
 List of food companies

References

External links

 Official website
 Moody's rating raised 

Food and drink companies based in Istanbul
Turkish brands
Companies listed on the Istanbul Stock Exchange
Yıldız Holding
Food and drink companies established in 1944
Turkish companies established in 1944
Confectionery companies
Chocolate companies
Dairy products companies